Kuzman Anastasov Shapkarev,, (1 January 1834 in Ohrid – 18 March 1909 in Sofia) was a Bulgarian  folklorist, ethnographer and scientist from the Ottoman region of Macedonia, author of textbooks and ethnographic studies and a significant figure of the Bulgarian National Revival.

Biography 

Kuzman Shapkarev was born in Ohrid in 1834. He was a teacher in a number of Bulgarian schools in Ohrid, Bitola, Prilep, Kukush, Thessaloniki, (1854-1883). In these towns he was especially active in introducing the Bulgarian language in local schools. Не initiated the establishment of two Bulgarian high schools in Solun in 1882–1883.

He wrote the following textbooks: "A Bulgarian Primer" (1866), "A Big Bulgarian Reader" (1868), "Mother tongue" (1874), "Short Land description (Geography)" (1868), "Short Religion Book" (1868) and others. Shapkarev criticized the dominance of eastern Bulgarian and even declared that it was incomprehensible in Macedonia. In his Great Bulgarian Textbook (Golema balgarska chitanka) from 1868, which he authored under the pseudonym "One Macedonian" (Edin Makedonets), he stated his intention to write in a language understandable to his compatriots, the Macedonian Bulgarians. He also announced a project of a dictionary that would contain translation from Macedonian into Upper Bulgarian and vice versa This activity was condemned by the Bulgarian press, which even accused Kuzman Shapkarev of advocating the existence of a separate Macedonian language and of a distinct history of the Macedonian people.

Shapkarev was a contributor of many Bulgarian newspapers and magazines – "Tsarigradski vestnik" (Constantinople newspaper), "Gayda" (Bagpipe), "Macedonia", "Pravo" (Justice), "Savetnik" (Adviser), "Balgarska pchela" (Bulgarian bee) and others. Shapkarev was a collaborator of the revolutionary Georgi Rakovski and in the field of ethnography, he assisted the Miladinov Brothers.

After 1883 he lived in Eastern Rumelia and Bulgaria – in Plovdiv, Sliven, Stara Zagora, Vraca and Orhanie (Botevgrad). Along with his scientific and public occupation in Bulgaria he worked as a notary and a judge.

From onwards 1900 he was a regular member of Bulgarian Academy of Sciences.

His autobiographical book is called "Materials for the Revival of Bulgarian national spirit in Macedonia".

His first son  was one of the leading activists of Internal Macedonian Revolutionary Organization, while the second –  was a high-ranking Bulgarian Army officer. His grandson  was a prominent Bulgarian economist, chairman of the Macedonian Scientific Institute, while his great grandson  was a prominent Bulgarian sculptor.

Works

Scientific works 
 Rusalii. The old and too interesting Bulgarian custom preserved in Southern Macedonia, Plovdiv, 1884
 "The Serbian Greatideas' endeavours and our scientifists", 1888
 "Several notes about Macedono-Slav collection of P. Draganov" 1895
 "Collection of folk monuments (Bulgarian folk tales and beliefs), 1885
 Collection of Bulgarian Folklore (Сборник от български народни умотворения), vol. І-ІІІ, Sofia, 1891–1894
 Materials for the Biography of the Miladinov Brothers - Dimitar and Konstantin (Материали за животоописанието на Братя Миладинови, Димитрия и Константина), Plovdiv 1884

Textbooks 
A Bulgarian Primer, 1868
A Big Bulgarian Reader, 1868
Short Land description for children, 1868
Short History of the Old and New Testament and a short cathehism, 1868
Holy Gospel or a collection of gospel readings, 1870
A collection of the Apostolic readings, 1870
Mother tongue, 1874
The Bulgarian Folklore Collection (Сборник от български народни умотворения), in several volumes:
 Books I,III,IV,V,VI - Песни (Songs)
 Book VII: Български обичаи, обряди, суеверия и костюмы (Bulgarian customs, rituals, beliefs and costumes), 1891
 Books VIII and IX: Български прикаски и вѣрования съ прибавление на нѣколко Македоновлашки и Албански (Bulgarian folktales and beliefs with some Macedo-Romanian and Albanian) 1892, 1894 (same, in a modern edition, with modernized spelling)
 (Note: Book II did not exist)

Autobiographical books 
 Contribution to education in Macedonia. One autobiography of Kuzman Shapkarev, Macedonian review, Sofia 1927, vol 2
"Materials for Revival of Bulgarian national spirit in Macedonia", Sofia 1984

Honours
Shapkarev Buttress on Fallières Coast, Antarctica is named after Kuzman Shapkarev.

External links 

K.A. Shapkarev. Bulgarian Primer, part A. (Constantinople, 1868).

References

1834 births
1909 deaths
People from Ohrid
Bulgarian writers
Bulgarian educators
Bulgarian folklorists
Bulgarian judges
Linguists from Bulgaria
19th-century Bulgarian people
Members of the Bulgarian Academy of Sciences
Macedonian Bulgarians
Bulgarian ethnographers